This is a list of women photographers who were born in Sweden or whose works are closely associated with that country.

A
 Sofia Ahlbom (1803–1868), feminist, practiced as a photographer from the 1860s
 Elise Arnberg (1826–1891), miniaturist and photographer

B
 Beata Bergström (1921–2016), photographer, known for her dance and theatre work
 Arvida Byström (born 1991), photographer and model based in Los Angeles

C
 Anna Clarén (born 1972), photographer and educator

D
 Lotten von Düben (1828–1915), early amateur photographer

E
 Hélène Edlund (1858–1941), views of buildings and nature of Skansen
 Hedda Ekman (1860–1929), writer and photographer

F
 Ingrid Falk (born 1960), installation artist
 Hanna Ferlin (1870–1947), photographer and suffragist
 Maria Friberg (born 1966), painter, photographer, video artist

G
 Marianne Greenwood (1916–2006), photographed Picasso and other artists in Antibes after the Second World War, later photographing the peoples of the Pacific islands and parts of Asia

H
 Johanna Hald (born 1945), screenwriter, photographer
 Caroline Hebbe (1930–2018), art photographer with the Fotofrom movement
 Brita Sofia Hesselius (1801–1866), Sweden's first professional female photographer, opening a studio in Karlstad in 1845

J
 Selma Jacobsson (1841–1899), royal court photographer
 Lina Jonn (1861–1896), early Swedish professional photographer in Helsingborg and Lund, remembered for her documentary work

K
 Edit Kindvall (1866–1951), Storvik photographer and women's rights activist
 Marie Kinnberg (1806–1858), painter and pioneering photographer
 Caroline von Knorring (1841–1925), one of Sweden's first professional female photographers

L
 Wilhelmina Lagerholm (1826–1917), portrait and genre painter, photographer
 Annika Larsson (born 1972), contemporary artist, photographer
 Tuija Lindström (1950–2017), noted for her black-and-white pictures of women in a black lake addressing feminist issues

M
 Gunnie Moberg (1941–2007), photographer in the Orkneys, Shetlands and Faroes

O
 Elisabeth Ohlson (born 1961), photographs sexual minorities, noted for her 1998 Ecce Homo portraying Jesus among homosexuals

P
 Katarina Pirak Sikku (born 1965), Swedish Sami painter and photographer

R
 Mathilda Ranch (1860–1938), early professional photographer who ran studios in Varberg and the surrounding area
 Anna Riwkin-Brick (1908–1970), portrait and dance photography, photo-journalistic work

S
 Emma Schenson (1827–1913), early professional photographer
 Kristina Schmid (born 1972), fine art photographer
 Helene Schmitz (born 1960), photographer, writer
 Olga Segerberg (1868–1951), photographer and suffragist
 Hilda Sjölin (1835–1915), one of Sweden's first professional female photographers, opening a studio in Malmö in 1861
 Rosalie Sjöman (1833–1919), highly regarded portrait photographer
 Hedvig Söderström (1830–1914), first woman to open a studio in Stockholm

T
 Maria Tesch (1850–1936), professional photographer, studio in Linköping
 Ida Trotzig (1864–1943), photographer, ethnographer, Japanologist, painter and writer

V
 Bertha Valerius (1835–1915), official photographer of the Royal Swedish court

W
 Berit Wallenberg (1902–1995), archaeologist, art historian, photographer

See also
 List of women photographers

-
Swedish
Photographers
Photographers, women